Bwenieve Records is a Kenyan-based record label founded by producer Agundabweni Akweyu and his wife Evelyn Wanjiru, a Kenyan gospel musician. The label produced hit songs for musicians such as Wanjiru, Gloria Muliro, Emmy Kosgei, Kambua, Tumaini and Martha Mwaipaja.

History

Founding

Bwenieve Records was founded on May 5, 2010, in Nakuru Kenya, when producer Agundabweni Akweyu, working for a human resources firm, discovered Evelyn Wanjiru, who could not source a producer to record her music. Agundabweni decided to study music production online through YouTube tutorials so that he could record Evelyn. On May 5, 2010 Agundabweni resigned his job and teamed up with Wanjiru to start Bwenieve records. The name Bwenieve was derived from Agundabweni's and Evelyn's names (Bweni-Eve). Between 2010 and 2013, Bwenieve produced "Mazingira", "Waweza", and "Mungu Mkuu", songs for Evelyn that did well and got a lot of radio and TV airplay. The success of the two songs was good for Bwenieve Records, and upcoming musicians gained confidence in the label. Songs like "Mungu yu mwema" by Praise Makena, "Kiwango" by Meisi Tamar and "Angalia Baba" by Rosemary Njagi were among the first few songs produced from Bwenieve during that period.

In 2014, Bwenieve records relocated to Nairobi and produced "Tulia", a collaboration between Vicky Kitonga and Wanjiru. In 2015, Tulia won a Groove Award in the Collaboration of the Year category. This resulted in a turnaround in the Kenyan gospel scene, drawing upcoming and established musicians to aspire to work with Bwenieve Records. Since then Bwenieve has produced songs for Emmy Kosgei, Gloria Muliro, Kambua, Tumaini, Mercy Masika, Size 8, Amani and more. Also Bwenieve is the producer of the live annual event known as Praise Atmosphere hosted by Evelyn Wanjiru.

Studios
Bwenieve Studio is currently located in Nairobi Lang'ata Kenya.

Accolades

Discography 
Singles

Albums

References 

Kenyan gospel musicians
Kenyan record labels
Kenyan record producers